Sven-Eric Liedman (born 1 June 1939 in Karlskrona) is a Swedish author and Professor Emeritus of history of ideas at the University of Gothenburg in Gothenburg, Sweden.

Liedman received his Bachelor of Arts degree in theoretical philosophy at Lund University in 1959. In 1961 he received a Licentiate of Philosophy degree in the same subject. His most important teacher in Lund was Gunnar Aspelin. He then moved to the University of Gothenburg, where he received his Ph.D. in history of ideas in 1966.

In 1966-1968 he worked at Sydsvenskan, a major newspaper in southern Sweden. In 1968 he held a temporary position at Lund University. In 1979 he was appointed Professor of history of ideas at the University of Gothenburg, where he remained until his retirement in 2006.

Sven-Eric Liedman is the author of a well-known Swedish textbook on the history of political ideas, with the prefix "Från Platon till..." in its title. The textbook has since its first edition in 1972 been updated many times. The title has also changed to reflect the changes. The first edition was called "Från Platon till Lenin" (from Plato to Lenin). The last edition is called "Från Platon till demokratins kris" (from Plato to democracy's crisis).

Awards 
 August Prize, 1997.
 Kellgren Prize, 2002.
 Wettergrens bokollon, 2004.
 Lotten von Kræmer Prize from Samfundet De Nio, 2005.
 Swedish Academy Nordic Prize, 2008.

References

External links 
 Prof. em. Sven-Eric Liedman's personal webpage

1939 births
Living people
People from Karlskrona
Swedish male writers
20th-century Swedish historians
Lund University alumni
University of Gothenburg alumni
Academic staff of the University of Gothenburg
August Prize winners
21st-century Swedish historians